Calophyllum confusum is a species of flowering plant in the Calophyllaceae family. It is found only in the Solomon Islands.

References

Flora of the Solomon Islands (archipelago)
Vulnerable plants
confusum
Endemic flora of the Solomon Islands
Taxonomy articles created by Polbot